Pigasus is a portmanteau word combining pig with Pegasus, the winged horse, and used to refer to a pig with wings. The name has been used by two different authors.

The Pigasus was used by John Steinbeck throughout his life as a personal symbol, with the Dog Latin motto Ad astra per alia porci, intended to mean "to the stars on the wings of a pig."  In Latin this is incorrect because "alia" means "other things," while "alas" would be the accusative form of "wings" after the preposition "per."  Steinbeck wrote in a letter that he regarded Pigasus as a symbol of himself, to show he was "earthbound but aspiring...not enough wingspread but plenty of intention."

Another Pigasus was a character in the Oz books written by Ruth Plumly Thompson in the 1930s. Her Pigasus was also a winged pig. His riders gained the gift of poesy, being magically compelled to speak in rhyming jingles while on his back.  The character first appeared in Pirates in Oz (1931) and played a major role in the plot of The Wishing Horse of Oz.

Mark Kistler's drawing instruction videos often feature a Pigasus.

See also

 Flying pig
 Pigasus (politics)

References

Literary characters introduced in 1931
Animals of Oz
Fictional pigs
John Steinbeck
Male characters in literature
Pigs in literature